Aackosoft International B.V. (1983 to 1988) was a Dutch video game developer and publisher that exclusively developed games for the MSX home computer,  becoming one of the biggest publishers for the MSX platform. It re-released some titles for the ZX Spectrum and Commodore 64, for which it also distributed software in their early years. Aackosoft filed for bankruptcy in 1988.

Aackosoft released its software under multiple labels. Besides the Aackosoft brand name, software was also released as Aackosoft Edusystems (for the educational titles), Eaglesoft (for budget titles released on cassette tapes), Eurosoft, Methodic Solutions and The ByteBusters. The latest was also the name of Aackosoft's programming team.

Many of Aackosoft's games are clones of more famous arcade games: Boom! (Galaxian), Hopper (Frogger), MacAttack (Burgertime), Oh Shit! (Pac-Man), Scentipede (Centipede), Jet Bomber (Zaxxon), Moon Rider (Moon Patrol), Space Busters (Space Invaders), Break In (Breakout), Time Curb (Time Pilot) and Robot Wars (Berzerk). Some more original games include Life in the Fast Lane, Kick It!, Drome, Skooter, North Sea Helicopter and Ultra Chess. In 1986 Aackosoft released Sprinter (aka The Train Game), featuring a 3D train simulation.

In addition to games, Aackosoft developed accounting and educational software for the MSX.

References

Defunct video game companies of the Netherlands
Companies based in Leiden
Video game companies established in 1983
Zoeterwoude